Raising the Fawn is a Canadian indie rock band, with its roots in Toronto. The band is composed of John Crossingham (who is also a member of Broken Social Scene), Scott Remila and Dylan Green (who are both members of City and Colour).

History

Raising the Fawn was formed by Crossingham, in 1997 as a solo recording project, but soon was joined by Remilla. They released their self-titled first album in 2001. The group grew to four members with the addition of singer Julie Booth and drummer Jon Drew.

The EP By the Warmth of Your Flame came out in 2003. 2004's The North Sea, recorded two years earlier,  contained lively, rhythmic arrangements. By the time it was released, Booth and Drew had left, and Green was the band's drummer.

In 2006 the now three-member band released The Maginot Line. The album was recorded near Kingston, Ontario and was a combination of indie rock and shoegazing music with heavy percussion.  That year the band toured Canada to promote the album.

Discography
 Raising the Fawn (2001)
 By the Warmth of Your Flame (2003)
 The North Sea (2004)
 "The News"
 "Home"
 "Gwendolyn"
 "July 23"
 "The North Sea"
 "Top to Bottom"
 "Drownded"
 "ETA"
 The Maginot Line (2006)
 "Pyotr"
 "Carbon Paper"
 "Maginot Line"
 "Ilyich"
 "Christmastime in the Fields"
 "Matador"
 "Nocturne No. 1"
 "Cloak and the Veil"
 "Gold and Red"
 "Until It Starts Again"
 "Nocturne No. 2"
 Sleight of Hand (2007)

References

External links
 "Dear Fate: Raising the Fawn's Rocky Road" CBC Radio 3 Session; story by Lorraine Carpenter, photography by Paule Clarke

Musical groups established in 1997
Musical groups from Toronto
Canadian indie rock groups
1997 establishments in Ontario
Sonic Unyon artists